This list includes people with natural red hair. Red or ginger hair may come in a variety of shades - from  strawberry blond to  auburn. With only 2% of the population having red hair, red is the rarest natural hair-coloration. The list includes people who have dyed their red hair into another colour or whose red hair has gone grey with age, but excludes people with hair dyed red (such as Tori Amos, Amanda Blake, David Bowie, Ann-Margret, Lucille Ball, Rita Hayworth, Debby Ryan, and Sophie Turner). Figures from the Bible (such as Esau or Judas Iscariot) or from classical mythology appear in the list, which however excludes characters from modern fiction such as Anne of Green Gables or Ginger Hebblethwaite.

A
 Abd al-Rahman I - First Emir of Cordoba
Abdullah of Córdoba - Seventh Emir of Cordoba
Al-Nu'man III ibn al-Mundhir - Last Lakhmid king of Al-Hirah
 Alexander II of Scotland – King of Scotland
 Sasha Alexander – Actress
 Canelo Álvarez – Boxer
 Lauren Ambrose – Actress
 Jane Asher – Actress
 Red Auerbach – Basketball coach who won eight straight NBA Championships and was the first coach to win 1,000 games
 Melissa Auf der Maur – Musician

B
 Stine Ballisager Pedersen — Danish footballer
 Marina Ruy Barbosa – Brazilian Model and actress
 Annalise Basso – American actress
 Bob Backlund - American pro wrestler
 Helena Barlow - English actress
 Mario Batali – Chef
 Ciara Baxendale – English actress
 Boris Becker – Tennis player
 Brian Byrne – Canadian singer and songwriter
 Jordie Benn – Professional Canadian ice-hockey player,  signed to play for NHL-based team, Minnesota Wild
 Saint Bernard of Clairvaux – 11th–12th-century Cistercian saint and a Catholic Doctor of the Church
 Caitlin Blackwood – Northern Irish actress
 Brendan Bracken - British Minister of Information from 1941 to 1945.
 Danny Bonaduce – radio and television personality, former child actor, and pro wrestler
 Anne Bonny – Irish pirate
 Katharina von Bora – wife of Martin Luther and former nun
 Boudicca – Queen of the Iceni, destroyed Roman Londinium
 Isabelle Boulay – Singer
 Clara Bow – Jazz Age actress and Hollywood movie star.  She had thick auburn hair dyed 'a flaming orange-red"
 Saint Brigid – 5th–6th-century Patron Saint of Ireland
 Louise Burfitt-Dons - Former politician
 Carol Burnett – Actress, comedian, singer, and writer
 Lucy Burns – Suffragist

C
 Louis C.K. – Actor and comedian
 James Cagney – Actor
 The Undertaker (Mark Calaway) – Professional wrestler
 Darby Camp – Actress
 William Campbell (missionary)
 Francesca Capaldi – American actress
 Spike Carlyle – American mixed martial artist (MMA)
 Carrot Top – Comedian
 David Caruso – Actor
 Anna Cathcart – Actress
 Catherine of Aragon – Queen Consort of England, daughter of Isabella I
 Jessica Chastain – Actress
 Winston Churchill – Prime Minister of the United Kingdom and author
 Nicky Clarke – Celebrity hairdresser
 Lily Cole – Actress and model
 Christopher Columbus – Explorer, first recorded European navigator to arrive in the West Indies
 Robin Cook – Politician
 Danny Cooksey – Actor and musician
 Calvin Coolidge – U.S. President
 Adrienne Corri – Actress
 Oliver Cromwell – English general and statesman
 Abigail Cowen – Actress

D
 Andy Dalton – NFL quarterback
 Leonardo da Vinci – Italian polymath
 Charles Dance – Actor
 Arthur Darvill — English actor
 Sam Darnold – NFL quarterback
 David – Biblical king of Israel
 Felicia Day – Actress, writer, director, violinist, and singer
 Kevin De Bruyne – Belgian footballer; plays in national teams; and with Manchester City F.C. since 2015, and continuing there 
 Juan Ponce de León – Spanish explorer
 Marquis de Sade – French politician
 Cintia Dicker – Brazilian model, actress and philanthropist
 Saint Dominic de Guzman – Founder of the Dominican Order
 Izzat Ibrahim al-Douri – Vice President of Iraq
 André van Duin – Dutch comedian, actor, singer-songwriter, author, television presenter, television director, television producer and screenwriter.

E
 Cody Eakin - Canadian ice hockey player
 Dale Earnhardt Jr.- American race car driver
 Katja Ebstein - German singer 

 Edward VI – King of England
 Danny Elfman  – Composer and singer
 Elizabeth I – Queen of England
 Elizabeth of York – Queen Consort of England
 Karen Elson – British model 
 Erik the Red – Eiríkr Thorvaldsson, the Viking coloniser of Greenland, known also as Eirik Raude
 Esau – Biblical figure, also known as Edom, meaning red; twin of Jacob
 Angie Everhart – Actress and model

F
 Michael Fassbender - Actor
 Sarah Ferguson – Duchess of York
 Isla Fisher – Actress
 Noel Fisher – Actor
 Kate Flannery - Actress
 Redd Foxx – Comedian; also known as "Chicago Red" In Harlem, he worked with and befriended Malcolm X; both men were described as "having reddish hair"; Malcolm X was nicknamed "Detroit Red" in this period.
 Diane Franklin – Actress
 Frederick I, Holy Roman Emperor – nicknamed "Barbarossa", meaning Redbeard
 Lynnette "Squeaky" Fromme – Notorious member of the Manson Family who tried to assassinate President Ford

G
 Jessica Gagen - English beauty pageant titleholder who was crowned Miss England 2022
 Courtney Gains - Actor
 Galileo Galilei - Italian astronomer
 James A. Garfield − 20th President of the United States
 Orla Gartland – Irish singer-songwriter
 John Paul Getty III – Heir to a great fortune; known for being kidnapped
 Karen Gillan – Actress
 Julia Gillard – 27th prime minister of Australia
 Claude Giroux - Canadian ice hockey player
 Brendan Gleeson — Irish actor
 Domhnall Gleeson — Irish actor
 Alexina Graham - English model
 Red Grammer – Singer-songwriter; especially for children
 Liam Gray – Documentary producer and artist
 Seth Green – Actor and comedian
 Rupert Grint – Actor
 Guinevere – Queen consort to King Arthur (hair colour sometimes described as "a very light strawberry-blonde")
 Martin Guptill – International cricketer
 Nell Gwynne – Actress and courtesan

H
 Ursula Halligan – Broadcaster
 Tarja Halonen – the 11th President of Finland
 Alexander Hamilton – 1st US Secretary of the Treasury, Founding Father
 John Hancock - President of the 2nd Continental Congress and first signer of the Declaration of Independence
 Pauline Hanson − Politician
 Prince Harry – Soldier, son of Charles III and Diana, Princess of Wales; grandson of Elizabeth II
 Carter Heaton - Baddie
 Lucas Hedges – Actor
 Henry II – King of England
 Henry VIII – King of England
 Hera Hilmar – Actress
 Chris Hipkins – 41st Prime Minister of New Zealand 
 James Hoban – Designer of the White House.
 Lauren Holly – Actress
 Bryce Dallas Howard – Actress
 Ron Howard – Actor and director
 Chlöe Howl – Singer-songwriter
 L. Ron Hubbard – Science fiction writer and founder of the Church of Scientology
 Mick Hucknall – Lead singer of Simply Red
 Karoline Herfurth – Actress

I

 Isabella I – Queen of Spain
 Ismail I – King of Persia
 Gianni Infantino – President of FIFA
 Muhammad Ibn Ismail VI - Tenth sultan of the Emirate of Granada

J
 Andrew Jackson – U.S. general and president.
 Laurence Jalbert – Singer
 James VI and I – King of Scotland, and later, concurrently, King of England. Longest reigning king of Scotland in history
 Thomas Jefferson – 3rd President of the United States
 Neil Jenkins – All-time record points scorer for the Welsh Rugby Union national team
 James Joyce – Author
 Juana of Castile – Heiress to the House of Trastámara, also known as "Juana la Loca" or "Joanna the Mad"

K
 Madeline Kahn – Broadway star, actress, and comedienne
 Lena Katina – Russian singer/songwriter; former member of t.A.T.u.
 Luke Kelly – Singer-songwriter; member of The Dubliners
 Erin Kellyman - English actress
 Ellie Kemper – Actress and comedy writer
 Phil Kessel – professional ice-hockey player, NHL Pittsburgh Penguins
 Joe Kennedy III – Politician
 Nicole Kidman - Actress
 King Krule - Singer-songwriter
 Neil Kinnock – Leader of the Labour Party
 Lettice Knollys – Duchess of Leicester and lady-in-waiting to Queen Elizabeth I
 Kennedy McMann - American actress

L
 Alexi Lalas - American soccer analyst and retired player
 William Lamport - Adventurer and the inspiration for Zorro.
 Lillie Langtry – Actress
 Tommi Läntinen – Singer-songwriter
 Jeff Larentowicz - American soccer player
 Rod Laver – Australian tennis player; holds all-time record for singles titles
 Rachelle Lefevre – Actress
 D. H. Lawrence – Author
 Laurel Lawson – Dancer, choreographer, engineer, sled(ge) hockey player (natural redhead)
 Vladimir Lenin – Bolshevik leader, founder of the USSR
 Rula Lenska – Actress
 Rose Leslie  – Actress
 Damian Lewis –  Actor
 Robyn Lively – Actress
 Lindsay Lohan – American actress and singer
 Tina Louise – Actress
 Myrna Loy – Actress
 Monique Luiz - Girl featured in the Daisy ad. 
 Kitty Lunn – Wheelchair ballerina and disability activist
 Sophia Lillis – Actress

M

 Rob Roy MacGregor – Famous highlander, derives his name from Scottish Gaelic word for "red"
 Aoife Mannion - Irish footballer
 Nico Manion – Professional basketball player
 St Mary Magdalene – Biblical figure traditionally portrayed with red hair
 Shirley Manson – Musician and actress
 Kate Mara – Actress
 Henri Matisse – Impressionist painter
 Jayma Mays – Actress
 Ginger McCain – Horse racing trainer with the most Grand National wins ever
 Dax McCarty – American soccer player
 Craig McDermott – Cricketer and coach
 Lanny McDonald – hockey player
 Gates McFadden – Actress
 Ewan McGregor – Actor
 Mark McGwire – Baseball player
 Barbara Meier – German Model 
 Dash Mihok – Actor
 Julianne Moore – Actress
 Jon Moxley – Professional Wrestler
 Barbara Murray – Actress
 Dave Mustaine – Guitarist and vocalist for Megadeth
 Gordon Murphy – Bowler

N
 Diane Neal - Actress, model

 Willie Nelson – Singer-songwriter; known as the Red Headed Stranger
 Nero – Roman emperor 
 Michel Ney – Napoleonic general known as 
 Alexei Romanov – Tsarevich of Russia
 Chuck Norris – Actor and martial artist

O

 Conan O'Brien – Comedian
 Michaela Odone – co-inventor of Lorenzo's oil.
 Red Hugh O'Donnell – King of Tír Chonaill who led a rebellion against English Rule in Ireland during the reign of Elizabeth I
 Catherine O'Hara - Actress
 Maureen O'Hara – Known as "The Queen of Technicolor" for her bright-red hair and green eyes
 Otto II – Holy Roman Emperor known as "Rufus" and also "Bloody"
Silvina Ocampo – Argentine poet and short story writer

P
 Robert Peel − Prime Minister of the United Kingdom
 Cassandra Peterson – Actress; known for her stage persona Elvira, Mistress of the Dark
 Madelaine Petsch –  Actress
 Sylvia Plath – Author and poet
 Shaun Pollock − Cricketer and sportscaster
 Scarlett Pomers - Actress
 Ezra Pound – Poet
 Laura Prepon –  Actress

Q
 Molly Quinn – Actress
 Muqan Qaghan - Third khagan of the Göktürks who expanded their khaganate.

R
 Charlotte Rae – Actress
 Yitzhak Rabin - Israeli Prime Minister
 Sarah Rafferty – Actress
 Bonnie Raitt – Blues musician
 Rameses II – Pharaoh
 Bridget Regan – Actress
 Marissa Ribisi – Actress
 Richard the Lionheart – King of England, leader of the Third Crusade
 Holland Roden – Actress
 Tatiana Romanov – Grand Duchess of Russia
 Axl Rose – Lead singer of Guns N' Roses
 Mark Rolston − Actor
 Ashleigh Ross – Australian actress
 Marion Ross – Actress
 William Rufus – King of England
 Rurik – Viking founder of Rurik Dynasty in Russia

S
 Margaret Sanger – Advocate for birth control
 Innokenty Smoktunovsky - Actor
 Sadie Sink - Actress
 Susan Sarandon – Actress
 Adam Savage – Special effects designer and television personality
 Brian Scalabrine – Former NBA player/champion. 
 Hannie Schaft - Dutch resistance member
 Ulrich Schindler
 Mike Schmidt - Baseball Hall of Fame 1995 Inductee
 Paul Scholes - English footballer
 Patti Scialfa – Singer and guitarist; E Street Band member
 Moira Shearer - Scottish ballerina and actress; star of Powell and Pressburger's The Red Shoes
 Ed Sheeran – Singer and songwriter
 George Bernard Shaw – Author and playwright
 Sheamus – Professional wrestler
 William Tecumseh Sherman – Union Army general in the American Civil War
 Renee Short – Politician
 Elizabeth Siddal – Artists' model and poet associated with the Pre-Raphaelite Brotherhood
 Beverly Sills – Opera singer
Jannik Sinner- Italian tennis player
 Sissy Spacek – Actress
 Vivian Stanshall – Singer
 Bram Stoker – Irish author, best known for the 1897 Gothic horror novel Dracula
 Eric Stoltz – American actor, director and producer
 Sarah Snook – Actress
 Nicoline Sørensen — Danish footballer

T
 William Howard Taft – 27th President of the United States
 Catherine Tate – Actress and comedian
 Corey Taylor – Singer-songwriter 
 Margaret Thatcher – Prime Minister of the United Kingdom
 Mark Twain – Author

U

V

 Martin Van Buren – 8th U.S. president known as the "Red Fox of Kinderhook"
 Vincent van Gogh – Artist
 Paul Vautin − Rugby league player and sportscaster

W
 Bill Walton - Basketball player and commentator.
 Zack Ward - Actor
 George Washington – First U.S. president and General
 Florence Welch - Singer
 Margot Werner - Ballerina
 Samantha Weinstein - Actress
 Carson Wentz - NFL Quarterback
 Shaun White – Professional snowboarder and skateboarder, known as The Flying Tomato
 Gene Wilder - Actor
 Mary Wiseman - Actress
 Ellen Wilkinson – Socialist minister known as "Red Ellen"
 Alicia Witt – Actress
 James Wolfe – Soldier
 Tom Wolfe – Author
 Bonnie Wright   – Actress

X
 Malcolm X - African-American Muslim minister and human rights activist. In 1940s Harlem, where he worked with and befriended Red Foxx, he had the nickname "Detroit Red" to distinguish him from Foxx, known as "Chicago Red"; both men were described as "having reddish hair".

Y
 Amy Yasbeck - Actress
Thom Yorke - Singer
 Brigham Young – Religious leader

Z
 Sami Zayn - Canadian professional wrestler

See also
 Redhead Day

References

Further reading
 
 
 
 

Red hair
Lists of people by physical attribute